In mathematics, minimum polynomial extrapolation is a sequence transformation used for convergence acceleration of vector sequences, due to Cabay and Jackson.

While Aitken's method is the most famous, it often fails for vector sequences. An effective method for vector sequences is the minimum polynomial extrapolation. It is usually phrased in terms of the fixed point iteration:

 

where  is the matrix whose columns are the  iterates starting at 2.

The following 4 line MATLAB code segment implements the MPE algorithm:

U = x(:, 2:end - 1) - x(:, 1:end - 2);
c = - pinv(U) * (x(:, end) - x(:, end - 1));
c(end + 1, 1) = 1;
s = (x(:, 2:end) * c) / sum(c);

References

Numerical analysis
Articles with example MATLAB/Octave code